Clouds is a 2000 stainless steel abstract sculpture by Hans Van de Bovenkamp, installed in Toledo's Harvard Terrace, in the U.S. state of Ohio.  Each cloud sculpture includes a downward-firing fountain ring simulating rain illuminated by multicolored lighting.  The artwork incorporating 3 clouds measures approximately 25 ft high by 30 ft in diameter.  It's the centerpiece of a traffic circle named the Harvard Circle Fountain at the junction of Harvard Blvd, Broadway St, Glendale Ave and River Rd.

References 

 

2000 sculptures
Stainless steel sculptures
Outdoor sculptures in Ohio